John of Luxembourg (died 22 June 1476) was Count of Marle and Count of Soissons between 1462 and 1476, Lord of Dunkirk, Gravelines and Bourbourg.

John was the eldest son of Louis de Luxembourg, Count of Saint-Pol and Jeanne de Bar, Countess of Marle and Soissons. He became Count of Marle and Soissons, following the death of his mother in 1462. In 1473, John became a member in the Order of the Golden Fleece. He was unable to inherit his father's lands, since his father was beheaded for treason in 1475 and his lands confiscated.

John was killed at the Battle of Morat, 22 June 1476. He never married and his lands went to his younger brother Peter.

References

Sources

 Raphael de Smedt (Ed.) : Les chevaliers de l’ordre de la Toison d’or au XVe siècle. Notices bio-bibliographiques. (Kieler Werkstücke, D 3) Verlag Peter Lang, Frankfurt 2000, p. 176f.

15th-century births
Year of birth uncertain
1476 deaths
15th-century French people
Counts of Soissons
House of Luxembourg
Knights of the Golden Fleece
Burgundian Wars
Military personnel killed in action